Paul Jeanneteau (born October 14, 1957 in Angers) is a member of the National Assembly of France.  He represents the Maine-et-Loire department, and is a member of the Union for a Popular Movement.

References

1957 births
Living people
People from Angers
Politicians from Pays de la Loire
Union for French Democracy politicians
Union for a Popular Movement politicians
Deputies of the 13th National Assembly of the French Fifth Republic